This is a list of things named for James Clerk Maxwell.

Science
 Maxwell–Betti reciprocal work theorem
 Maxwell–Bloch equations
 Maxwell–Huber–Hencky–von Mises theory
 Maxwell coupling
 Maxwell's discs
 Maxwell's theorem
 Maxwell's theorem (geometry)
 Maxwell's Wheel
 Maxwell's fisheye lens

Electromagnetism
Maxwell–Wagner–Sillars polarization
 Maxwell–Wien bridge, see Maxwell bridge
 Maxwell bivector
 Maxwell bridge
 Maxwell coil
 Maxwell displacement current
 Maxwell's equations (electromagnetism)
 Maxwell–Proca equation
 Maxwell–Ampere law
 The maxwell (Mx), a compound derived CGS unit measuring magnetic flux
 Maxwell tensor, also Maxwell stress tensor
 Maxwell–Lodge effect

Thermodynamics and kinetic theory
 Maxwell–Boltzmann statistics
 Maxwell–Boltzmann distribution (statistical thermodynamics), also known as Maxwellian curve, or Maxwellian for short.
 Maxwell–Jüttner distribution
 Maxwell–Stefan diffusion
 Maxwell's relations (thermodynamics)
 Maxwell's thermodynamic surface
 Maxwell's demon, a thought experiment in statistical physics
Maxwell construction
Maxwell equal area rule, see Maxwell construction
 Maxwell speed distribution
 Maxwell distribution, see Maxwell–Boltzmann distribution

Solid mechanics
 Maxwell material
 Maxwell model of elasticity, see Maxwell material
 Upper convected Maxwell model
 Generalized Maxwell model

Astronomy
12760 Maxwell, an asteroid
 Maxwell Montes, a mountain range on Venus
 The Maxwell Gap in the Rings of Saturn
 Maxwell (crater)

Optics
Maxwellian view, a method of illuminating the eye by focusing an image at the plane of the pupil.

Neuroscience
Maxwell's Spot, a reddish spot seen in the centre of a visual field when a white surface is viewed through a dichroic filter transmitting red and blue lights. In 1856, Maxwell observed a dark spot in the blue region of a prismatic spectrum. The spot moved with his eye but disappeared upon looking elsewhere in the spectrum. He concluded that the spot is an phenomenon produced in the eye (an entoptic phenomenon) by a localized absorption of blue light by the yellow pigment of the central region of the retina (the macula leutea). Maxwell also proposed that the spot appeared as the cross of fuzzy bow-tie shapes (Haidinger's brushes), one blue, the other yellow, when the light is polarized, discovered by Austrian physicist Wilhelm Karl von Haidinger in 1844.

Prizes
 James Clerk Maxwell Prize for Plasma Physics of the American Physical Society
 IEEE/RSE Wolfson James Clerk Maxwell Award
 Clerk Maxwell Prize, which was awarded by the British Institution of Radio Engineers
 James Clerk Maxwell Medal and Prize of the Institute of Physics

Others

 The James Clerk Maxwell Telescope, the largest submillimetre-wavelength astronomical telescope in the world, with a diameter of 
 The James Clerk Maxwell Building of the University of Edinburgh, housing the schools of mathematics, physics and meteorology
 The James Clerk Maxwell building at the Waterloo campus of King's College London, in commemoration of his time as Professor of Natural Philosophy at King's from 1860 to 1865. The university also has a chair in Physics named after him, and a society for undergraduate physicists.
 The James Clerk Maxwell Centre of the Edinburgh Academy
 The Maxwell Centre at the University of Cambridge, dedicated to academia-industry interactions in Physical Sciences and Technology.
 Maxwell Institute for Mathematical Sciences at the Universities of Edinburgh and Heriot-Watt
 James Clerk Maxwell Foundation
 Maxwell Year 2006, website celebrating the 175th anniversary of his birth
 Nvidia Maxwell, a GPU architecture released in 2014.
 Maxwell (Almighty God). The God mentioned throughout the Tales Of video-game franchise. The Almighty Being in the story is named after him and places him on a pedestal as the Lord of Creation, making appearances in Tales of Phantasia, Tales of Phantasia 2, Tales of Eternia, Tales of Symphonia, Tales of Symphonia: Dawn of a New World, Tales of Xillia and Tales of Xillia 2.
 The Maxwell radar-detector in the video-game Crossout.
 A statue on Edinburgh's George Street
 A proposed sculpture called the Star of Caledonia is to pay tribute to Maxwell.
 ANSYS software for electromagnetic analysis, named Maxwell

See also
 Maxwellian

Footnotes

M
James Clerk Maxwell